Mendocino Headlands State Park is a California State Park in Mendocino, California.

The park began operation in 1974, after several years of concern and discussion from citizens about the possibility of blufftop development. The Big River Unit was added in 2002.

Headlands
The headlands are rocky bluffs overlooking the Pacific Ocean surrounding Mendocino. The section of headlands along the south side of Main Street in Mendocino is narrow and covered by blackberry and rose brambles. To the west and north of town, the headlands widen to a region of coastal prairie crossed by Heeser Road and several footpaths.

Ford House Museum, at the eastern end of the town of Mendocino on the headlands side of Main Street, is the park headquarters and visitor center. It offers information and videos about the history and biology of the Mendocino area, including the town's boom in the logging era, the migration of the gray whales, and a scale model of the town as it was in 1890. Guided walks on the headlands are also available.

The Mendocino Music Festival is held on the headlands in July.

Beaches
Mendocino Headlands State Park contains two publicly accessible beaches.

Big River Beach is at the mouth of the Big River, south of the town; it is a wide sandy beach that often has a lagoon where the river meets the Pacific Ocean. It can be reached via footpaths from the east end of Mendocino (on Main Street behind the Presbyterian Church) or from a parking lot on the inland side of State Route 1 that also serves the Big River Unit.

Portuguese Beach is a smaller cove, under the headlands at the west end of Main Street. From the end of the street, a footpath along the headlands leads to a staircase to the beach.

Below the headlands to the north, there are many small coves that are accessible only by boat.

Big River Unit

It includes  of wetlands and the longest undeveloped estuary in Northern California. The park was created on July 30, 2002, after a group of donors, nonprofit organizations, and agencies, led by the Mendocino Land Trust, collected over 25 million dollars to purchase the property from the Hawthorne Timber Company and conveyed it to the California State Park system. The park includes remnants of the historic Mendocino Lumber Company sawmill.

The unit can be reached by State Route 1, south of Mendocino. Amenities are few, but include hiking paths on both sides of the river. Canoes and kayaks can be used to paddle through  of forest.

At the mouth of the river, a footpath leads north under the Highway 1 bridge to Big River beach and the town of Mendocino. Inland, north of the river, the unit abuts Mendocino Woodlands State Park; the hiking path on the north bank of the river leads from one park to the other. On the south side of the river Van Damme State Park.

References

External links
 Mendocino Headlands State Park, Mendocino Headlands brochure, and Mendocino Area Parks Association, from the California State Parks web site
 Mendocino Land Trust: Big River Program and About Big River
 Paddling Our State Parks
 Map of the Big River Unit
 Letters regarding logging road use in the Big River Unit including details of the 2002 purchase

Parks in Mendocino County, California
State parks of California
Beaches of Mendocino County, California
Protected areas established in 1974
Museums in Mendocino County, California
Beaches of Northern California
1974 establishments in California